Diane-Gabrielle de Damas de Thianges (1656–1715) was a French aristocrat.

The wife of Philippe Jules Mancini, Duke of Nevers, she was the unofficial lover of king Louis XIV of France in 1676, and was repeatedly the object of rumours of a love affair with the king between 1671 and 1681.

References

1656 births
1715 deaths
Mistresses of Louis XIV